"Velouria" is a song by the American alternative rock band Pixies, written and sung by the band's frontman Black Francis. "Velouria" was released as a single in July 1990 and was the band's first UK Top 40 hit. It was included as the third track on their album Bossanova released a month later. The song features extensive use of theremin. It featured on the influential 1990 Madchester compilation album Happy Daze.

Lyrics 
Black Francis said of the lyrics to the song in an interview with SongFacts, "It's folklore based; the Rosicrucians of 1920s San Jose California had some pretty interesting ideas."

Composition 
The song has been labeled as punk rock and surf rock by critics.

Video 
As "Velouria" was climbing up the UK Top 40, the band was offered a spot on Top of the Pops. However, a BBC rule stated that only singles with videos could be performed on the show. To counter this, a cheap video was made with the band being filmed running down a quarry.

In the video, 23 seconds of footage (the time needed for the band members to reach the camera) is slowed in order to last for the duration of the song. However, the effort in filming the video was in vain; Pixies did not play "Velouria" on Top of the Pops while the single was in the charts.

In media 
"Velouria" is played in the AMC show Halt and Catch Fire during season 3, episode 9, 'NIM'.

Track listing

Covers 
 1999 – The song was covered by Weezer in the tribute album Where Is My Mind? A Tribute to the Pixies. This version was praised by Black Francis as his favorite cover of a Pixies song.
 2004 – Black Francis re-recorded a version of "Velouria" with Keith Moliné and Andy Diagram for his album Frank Black Francis.
 2004 – The Bad Plus covered the song in their album Give.
 2008 – A cover of the song appeared on Rockabye Baby! Lullaby Renditions of the Pixies, part of the Rockabye Baby! series of albums.

Charts

References 

Sources
Frank, Josh; Ganz, Caryn (2005). Fool the World: The Oral History of a Band Called Pixies. Virgin Books. .

External links 
 
 

1990 singles
Pixies (band) songs
Songs written by Black Francis
Elektra Records singles
4AD singles
Song recordings produced by Gil Norton
1990 songs
UK Independent Singles Chart number-one singles